The 1977 U.S. National Indoor Championships was a men's tennis tournament played on indoor hard courts at the Racquet Club of Memphis in Memphis, Tennessee in the United States that was part of the 1977 Colgate-Palmolive Grand Prix. It was the eighth edition of the tournament was held from February 28 through March 6, 1977. First-seeded Björn Borg won the singles title and $24,500 first-prize money.

Finals

Singles
 Björn Borg defeated  Brian Gottfried 6–4, 6–3, 4–6, 7–5
 It was Borg's first singles title of the year and the 20th of his career.

Doubles
 Fred McNair /  Sherwood Stewart defeated  Bob Lutz /  Stan Smith 	4–6, 7–6, 7–6

References

External links
 ITF tournament edition details

Volvo U.S. National Indoor
U.S. National Indoor Championships
U.S. National Indoor Championships
U.S. National Indoor Championships
U.S. National Indoor Tennis Championships
U.S. National Indoor Tennis Championships